"Jesus Christ" is a song written in 1940 by Woody Guthrie. The song tells in eight verses what Jesus preached in his time, especially about the rich and the poor, and that he was killed by different groups who rejected his preaching ("they laid Jesus Christ in his grave"). The ninth verse says that Jesus would have been killed by modern capitalist society just as he was in his own time.  The song was partially sung and played on the piano by the Guthrie character in the 1976 biographical film Bound For Glory, set to the same tune as the folk ballad "Jesse James".

"I wrote this song looking out of a rooming house window in New York City in the winter of Nineteen and Forty. I thought I had to put down on paper how I felt about the rich folks and the poor ones."

Covers
The song was among others covered by Irish band U2, whose version appeared on the 1988 Guthrie tribute album Folkways: A Vision Shared.

See also
 Jesus Christ in popular culture

References

Woody Guthrie songs
1940 songs
Songs about Jesus
Songs written by Woody Guthrie